The 2016 European Individual Speedway Junior Championship (also known as the 2016 Speedway European Under 21 Championship) was the 19th edition of the Championship.

The final was staged at Lamothe-Landerron, in France and was won by Dimitri Bergé,

Final
 10 September 2016
  Lamothe-Landerron

See also 
 2016 Speedway European Championship

References

Individual Speedway Junior European Championship
2016 in speedway
2016 in French sport
International sports competitions hosted by France